is a Japanese actress, voice actress and singer from Saitama Prefecture, Japan. She is a former member of the Japanese girl group 9nine. Her solo single "Maji de Koi Suru 5 Byō Mae/Ichigo Iro no Kimochi", on the Watashi no Yasashikunai Senpai soundtrack, reached #46 on the Oricon chart. As an actress, she played in numerous Japanese TV series and movies.

Biography 
Umika Kawashima was born in the Saitama Prefecture. She was scouted in Shibuya when she was in 6th grade and joined Lespros Entertainment. The actresses she idolizes are Aoi Miyazaki, Yui Aragaki and Kou Shibasaki. She has stated that she would like to collaborate with Masaharu Fukuyama. She graduated from the Faculty of Arts and Letters at Meiji University with a degree in psychology in 2016.

Career
Since 2006, Kawashima has appeared in numerous television dramas and movies. In 2007 she joined the female idol group 9nine, however she announced her graduation from the group in 2016 to focus on her acting career. She appeared for her final performance with the group during "9nine LIVE 2016," BEST 9 Tour" after being with the group for nine and a half years. Early 2016, it was announced that Kawashima would become a regular alongside Masu Taichi on the television program ZIP!. Kawashima commented, "Now is the time to move forward. I want to present an exciting program without any accidents." She receives her first leading role as a voice actress in the 2017 summer anime series, Nana Maru San Batsu.

Filmography

TV dramas

Films

Television animation

Dubbing
Hotel Transylvania, Mavis Dracula
Hotel Transylvania 2, Mavis Dracula
Hotel Transylvania 3: Summer Vacation, Mavis Dracula
Hotel Transylvania: Transformania, Mavis Dracula

Awards 
 2009: The 2nd Tokyo Drama Awards: Best Newcomer Award
 2010: The 23rd Japan Best Dressed Eyes Awards Special Prize
 2013: The 24th Best Jewery Dresser in Japan (section of teens)

References

External links 
 Official blog 
 Official agency profile 
 
 

1994 births
Living people
Japanese child actresses
Japanese women pop singers
Japanese film actresses
Japanese idols
Japanese television actresses
Japanese voice actresses
Musicians from Saitama Prefecture
Voice actresses from Saitama Prefecture
21st-century Japanese actresses
21st-century Japanese singers
21st-century Japanese women singers